James Edward Bowler CB (born July 1973) is a senior British civil servant currently serving as the Permanent Secretary to the Treasury since October 2022 having previously served as permanent secretary at the Department for International Trade since 2021. Before assuming this role, Bowler was the second permanent secretary at the Cabinet Office from 2020 to 2021 where he led the COVID Taskforce for the British Government. He was the Director General for Policy, Communication and Analysis at the Ministry of Justice from March to October 2020. Bowler is currently Trustee of the charity Police Now.

Education
Bowler was educated at Abingdon School from 1986 until 1991. He then attended Cardiff University where he studied Economics.

Career
Prior to March 2020 Bowler worked at Her Majesty's Treasury for eight years, serving the positions of Director General for Public Spending between May 2017 and March 2020, Director General for Tax and Welfare between April 2015 and May 2017 and Director for Strategy, Planning and Budget between January 2012 to April 2015. Bowler was promoted to Director General in April 2015.

In May 2010 when David Cameron became Prime Minister, Bowler was appointed to the post of Principal Private Secretary to the Prime Minister serving until December 2011.

Bowler has also served under Gordon Brown when he was Chancellor of the Exchequer having been appointed as his Principal Private Secretary between 2005 and 2007. Bowler continued to work closely with Brown during his premiership as Prime Minister.

He was appointed Companion of the Order of the Bath (CB) in the 2012 New Year Honours.

In May 2021, it was announced that Bowler would become the new Permanent Secretary to the Department for International Trade.

In October 2022, Bowler was appointed as the new Permanent Secretary to the Treasury.

See also
 List of Old Abingdonians

References

Positions held 

1973 births
Living people
People educated at Abingdon School
Alumni of Cardiff University
British civil servants
Civil servants in HM Treasury
British Prime Minister's Office
Principal Private Secretaries to the Prime Minister
Companions of the Order of the Bath
British Permanent Secretaries
Permanent Secretaries of HM Treasury